Cargojet Inc. is a scheduled cargo airline based in Mississauga, Ontario, Canada. It operates cargo services in Canada and internationally, as well as full aircraft charters. Its main base is John C. Munro Hamilton International Airport. Cargojet is a public company with over 1650 employees.

History 

In August 2001, Dr. Ajay Virmani formed Canada 3000 Cargo Inc., a joint venture with Canada 3000 Airlines. In 2002, Dr. Virmani acquired 100% of Canada 3000 Cargo Inc. and rebranded the company as Cargojet Canada Ltd.  In July 2002 it acquired Winnport Logistics.  In 2005, Cargojet became a public company.  In May 2019, Cargojet announced a partnership with Canadian rapper Drake, naming him an ambassador of the brand.

Destinations

Cargojet operates a domestic scheduled cargo service to 15 Canadian destinations. Cargojet also operates an international scheduled cargo network which includes routes to several countries and territories, including Bermuda, Cuba, Germany, Japan, 
Mexico, the United Kingdom, and the United States of America.

Fleet

On 12 January 2021, Cargojet announced its intent to add additional Boeing 767F as well as Boeing 777F aircraft to its fleet.

As of July 2022, Cargojet has the following aircraft registered with Transport Canada.

References

External links 

Official website

Companies listed on the Toronto Stock Exchange
Air Transport Association of Canada
Cargo airlines of Canada
Airlines established in 2002
2002 establishments in Ontario